AFL Dream Team is an online Australian rules football based fantasy football game that was created in 2001 by Vapormedia and published by the Australian Football League (AFL) and Toyota.  Participants assemble an imaginary team of real life players, limited by a salary cap, and score points based on those players' actual statistical performance on the field of play throughout the AFL home-and-away season.  It is the second most popular Australian rules football fantasy game behind News Corporation's Supercoach game. It is similar to an offline based game of the same name that was run in the 1990s by The Age newspaper in Melbourne.

Point scoring
Points are gained or deducted depending on the performances of your 22 players for each round. Up to four emergencies can replace players in your starting 22, who didn't play that specific round. If you have a 0 scoring player in a certain position and don't have an emergency selected in that position, you'll not score any points for that player. You can choose who on the reserves list you'll use as an emergency. Meanwhile, the remaining five substitutes on your reserves list don't score, but can increase in value.  Each week up to two trades can be made but if there are bye rounds that happen in generally round 10-14, you are given 3 trades a week.

Points are awarded for the following achievements.

 Kick = 3 Points
 Handball = 2 Points
 Mark = 3 Points
 Tackle = 4 Points
 Free Kick For = 1 Point
 Free Kick Against = -3 Points
 Hitout = 1 Point
 Goal = 6 Points
 Behind = 1 Point

References

Fantasy sports
Australian Football League
Internet properties established in 2003